Mathéo Didot (born 25 April 2002) is a French professional footballer who plays as a midfielder for French club Guingamp II.

Club career
Didot made his debut with Guingamp in a 2–0 Ligue 2 win over AC Ajaccio on 13 March 2021.

Personal life
Didot is the son of Sylvain Didot and nephew of Étienne Didot, both former professional footballers.

References

External links
 

2002 births
Living people
French footballers
Association football midfielders
En Avant Guingamp players
Ligue 2 players
Championnat National 2 players